Joseph-Breitbach-Preis (Joseph Breitbach Prize) is a literary prize awarded by the Akademie der Wissenschaften und der Literatur Mainz (Academy of Sciences and Literature of Mainz), in Germany and the Joseph Breitbach Foundation.  Established in 1998, the prize is worth 50,000 euros and is awarded annually in Koblenz, birthplace of writer Joseph Breitbach (1903–1980), for whom the prize is named.

Winners 

 1998: Hans Boesch, Friedhelm Kemp, Brigitte Kronauer
 1999: Reinhard Jirgl, Wolf Lepenies, Rainer Malkowski
 2000: Ilse Aichinger, W. G. Sebald, Markus Werner
 2001: Thomas Hürlimann, Ingo Schulze, 
 2002: Elazar Benyoëtz, Erika Burkart, Robert Menasse
 2003: Christoph Meckel, Herta Müller, Harald Weinrich
 2004: Raoul Schrott
 2005: Georges-Arthur Goldschmidt
 2006: Wulf Kirsten
 2007: Friedrich Christian Delius
 2008: Marcel Beyer
 2009: Ursula Krechel
 2010: Michael Krüger
 2011: Hans Joachim Schädlich
 2012: Kurt Flasch
 2013: Jenny Erpenbeck
 2014: Navid Kermani
 2015: Thomas Lehr
 2016: Reiner Stach
 2017: Dea Loher
 2018: Arno Geiger
 2019: Thomas Hettche
 2020: Nora Bossong
 2021: 
 2022: Natascha Wodin

References

External links
 
Joseph-Breitbach-Preis on Akademie der Wissenschaften und der Literatur Mainz website 

German literary awards